Chanel Branch (born February 6, 1980) is an American politician who represented the 45th legislative district in the Maryland House of Delegates from 2020 to 2023. Governor Larry Hogan appointed Branch to replace Cheryl Glenn after Glenn resigned and pleaded guilty to federal corruption charges.

Background
Branch was born on February 6, 1980, in Baltimore, Maryland, where she graduated from Paul Laurence Dunbar High School. She attended Baltimore City Community College and the TESST College of Technology.

In July 2017, Branch's son was murdered in Baltimore City. She lobbied, alongside her father, Delegate Talmadge Branch, for stricter sentences for handgun violations  and for $3.6 million to expand Safe Streets, an anti-violence initiative. Since 2019, she has been a member of Safe Streets and Mothers of Murdered Sons & Daughters.

In the summer of 2019, Branch filed to fill a vacancy in the Baltimore City Council that was left by the appointment of Brandon Scott to serve as the council's president. In October 2019, Branch announced her candidacy for the Baltimore City Council, seeking to challenge councilmember Danielle McCray, who won the nomination over Branch. Branch dropped out of the race for the Baltimore City Council on February 4, 2020.

In January 2020, after the resignation of Delegate Cheryl Glenn following federal corruption charges, Branch applied to fill the seat vacated by Glenn in the Maryland House of Delegates. The Baltimore City Democratic Central Committee voted to recommend Branch to the seat, with three members, including herself, voting for Branch and the other four members split among three other candidates. During the committee vote, party officials prevented reporters from entering the meeting room, saying that media was not allowed at the request of Humanim, the non-profit that owned the building. Reporters were later allowed to attend the second half of the meeting. Following this incident, 45th District residents delivered a letter to Baltimore Democratic leaders, alleging that the process of filling a House of Delegates vacancy violated party bylaws and the Maryland Open Meetings Act. The letter called for Governor Hogan and the Baltimore City Democratic State Central Committee to reject the nomination and do the vote over. Governor Hogan appointed Branch to the Maryland House of Delegates on January 28, 2020.

In the legislature
Branch was sworn in as a member of the Maryland House of Delegates on January 28, 2020.  She was assigned to the House Ways and Means committee and is member of the Legislative Black Caucus of Maryland and the Women Legislators of Maryland.

Branch filed to run for a full term in the 2022 elections. She lost the Democratic primary on July 19, 2022, finishing fourth behind Caylin Young, who had bested her by 116 votes.

Political positions

Crime
Branch introduced legislation in the 2022 legislative session that would establish specialized gun courts in Baltimore to expedite some firearm cases and, when appropriate, offer resources and support services instead of incarceration.

References

External links 
 

1980 births
21st-century American women politicians
21st-century American politicians
Living people
Democratic Party members of the Maryland House of Delegates
Women state legislators in Maryland